Hommage à Eberhard Weber is a live tribute album celebrating German double bassist and composer Eberhard Weber's 75th birthday recorded by the German public broadcaster SWR in Stuttgart in 2015 featuring Pat Metheny, Jan Garbarek, Gary Burton, Scott Colley, Danny Gottlieb, Paul McCandless, with Michael Gibbs and Helge Sunde conducting the SWR Big Band which was released on the ECM label.

Reception

The AllMusic review by Thom Jurek states, "Weber witnessed this concert from the seats; he was by all accounts not only pleased, but moved. This is an understandable response to Hommage à Eberhard Weber, which not only proves an exception to by-the-numbers tribute recordings, but stands as a daunting, creative, and enduring extension of the bassist's work". On All About Jazz, John Kelman said "Weber is not just all over this record in the various compositions that have been drawn from nearly his entire career, arranged for a series of guests and the SWR Big Band, but he is actually heard—and, for those fortunate enough to have been there, seen— performing in the form of archival video recordings played on a large screen hung above the stage: video samples, then, rather than merely audio samples ... Hommage à Eberhard Weber honors Weber in a way that both appreciates and respects ... and couldn't be a more perfect tribute—or a more perfect gift—to this uniquely talented and influential bassist/composer". The Guardian's John Fordham stated "Weber's sparing themes and subtle tone-poetry are perhaps better suited to small bands than orchestras, but there's a lot of heartfelt and often beautiful music here for his admirers". In The Irish Times, Cormac Larkin noted "Hommage is more than a tribute – it breathes new life into the playing of one of the founding fathers of European jazz". The Telegraph concert review by Sebastian Scotney stated "this weekend's 75th birthday concerts in Stuttgart for the German bassist Eberhard Weber are going to take some beating as the jazz events of the year".

Track listing

Personnel
Eberhard Weber – bass (from tapes)
Pat Metheny – guitars
Jan Garbarek – soprano saxophone
Gary Burton – vibraphone
Scott Colley – double bass
Danny Gottlieb – drums
Paul McCandless – English horn, soprano saxophone
Klaus Graf – alto saxophone
Ernst Hutter – euphonium
SWR Big Band conducted by Helge Sunde
Michael Gibbs – arranger, conductor (track 4)
Ralf Schmid (track 3), Libor Šíma (track 6), Rainer Tempel (track 5) – arranger

References

ECM Records live albums
Eberhard Weber live albums
2015 live albums